Ksenia Sergeevna Garanina (born 17 April 1997) is a footballer who plays as a forward for Shirak-Homenmen. Born in Russia, she represents the Armenia women's national team.

International career
Garanina capped for Armenia at senior level in a 1–1 friendly draw against Lithuania on 6 March 2020.

See also
List of Armenia women's international footballers

References

1997 births
Living people
Women's association football forwards
Russian women's footballers
Sportspeople from Udmurtia
People from Votkinsk
Russian Women's Football Championship players
Russian emigrants to Armenia
Naturalized citizens of Armenia
Armenian women's footballers
Armenia women's international footballers